Mariusz Niewiadomski (born 26 April 1959) is a Polish football defender.

References

1959 births
Living people
Polish footballers
Association football defenders
Gwardia Koszalin players
Lech Poznań players
Pogoń Szczecin players
Vasalunds IF players
Hapoel Tel Aviv F.C. players
Sokół Pniewy players
Warta Poznań players
Ekstraklasa players
I liga players
Poland under-21 international footballers
Polish expatriate footballers
Expatriate soccer players in Australia
Polish expatriate sportspeople in Australia
Expatriate footballers in Sweden
Polish expatriate sportspeople in Sweden
Expatriate footballers in Israel
Polish expatriate sportspeople in Israel